Oleg Viktorovich Krushin (3 October 1966 – 24 August 1992) was a Russian professional footballer.

Club career
He made his professional debut in the Soviet First League in 1983 for FC Tekstilshchik Ivanovo.

Death
He died in a car accident when he was driving from Rotor Volgograd training ground back home after a training session.

References

1966 births
Sportspeople from Ivanovo
1992 deaths
Road incident deaths in Russia
Soviet footballers
Russian footballers
Association football forwards
FC Tekstilshchik Ivanovo players
FC Rotor Volgograd players
FC Tekstilshchik Kamyshin players
Soviet Top League players
Russian Premier League players